The sugar industry subsumes the production, processing and marketing of sugars (mostly sucrose and fructose). Globally, most sugar is extracted from sugar cane (~80% predominantly in the tropics) and sugar beet (~ 20%, mostly in temperate climate, like in the U.S. or Europe).

Sugar is used for soft drinks, sweetened beverages, convenience foods, fast food, candy, confectionery, baked products, and other sweetened foods. Sugarcane is used in the distillation of rum.

Sugar subsidies have driven market costs for sugar well below the cost of production. As of 2018, 3/4 of world sugar production was not traded on the open market. The global market for sugar and sweeteners was some $77.5 billion in 2012, with sugar comprising an almost 85% share, growing at a compound annual growth rate of 4.6%.

Globally in 2018, around 185 million tons of sugar was produced, led by India with 35.9 million tons, followed by Brazil and Thailand. There are more than 123 sugar-producing countries, but only 30% of the produce is traded on the international market.

Market
Sugar subsidies have driven market costs for sugar well below the cost of production. As of 2019, 3/4 of world sugar production is never traded on the open market. Brazil controls half the global market, paying the most ($2.5 billion per year) in subsidies to its sugar industry.

The US sugar system is complex, using price supports, domestic marketing allotments, and tariff-rate quotas. It directly supports sugar processors rather than farmers growing sugar crops. The US government also uses tariffs to keep the US domestic price of sugar 64% to 92% higher than the world market price, costing American consumers $3.7 billion per year. A 2018 policy proposal to eliminate sugar tariffs, called "Zero-for-Zero", is currently (March 2018) before the US Congress. Previous reform attempts have failed.

The European Union (EU) is a leading sugar exporter. The Common Agricultural Policy of the EU used to set maximum quotas for production and exports, and a subsidized sugar sales with an EU-guaranteed minimum price. Large import tariffs were also used to protect the market. In 2004, the EU was spending €3.30 in subsidies to export €1 worth of sugar, and some sugar processors, like British Sugar, had a 25% profit margin.

A 2004 Oxfam report called EU sugar subsidies "dumping" and said they harm the world's poor. 
A WTO ruling against the EU quota and subsidy system in 2005-2006 forced the EU to cut its minimum price and quotas, and stop doing intervention buying. The EU abolished some quotas in 2015, but minimum prices remain. Tariffs also persist for most countries. In 2009, the EU granted Least Developed Countries (LDCs) zero-tariff access to the EU market as part of the Everything but Arms initiative.

As of 2018, India, Thailand, and Mexico also subsidize sugar.

Glucose syrups produced from wheat and corn (maize) compete with the traditional dry sugar market.

Global players

The top 10 sugar-producing companies based on production in 2010:

The global sugar industry has a low market share concentration. The top four sugar producers account for less than 20.0% of the market.

Products
 Raw sugar
 Liquid sugar
 Refined sugar
 Molasses
 Sugar alcohol
 Brown sugar
 Powdered sugar

Lobbying and marketing

The sugar industry engages in sugar marketing and lobbying, minimizing the adverse health effects of sugar—obesity and tooth decay—and influencing medical research and public health recommendations.

Organizations 

International Sugar Organization
Sugar Association (USA)
European Association of Sugar Manufacturers (EU)
Sugar Nutrition UK
Indian Sugar Mills Association
Global Energy Balance Network

History of the sugar industry

See also
Criticisms of the sugar industry
Food industry

Sugar industry of the Philippines
:Category:Sugar industry

References

Further reading

 
.
Agricultural economics
Food industry
Industries (economics)